Melbourne tram route 11 is operated by Yarra Trams on the Melbourne tram network from West Preston to Victoria Harbour. The  route is operated out of Preston depot with E class trams.

History
Route 11 was first allocated to the line between West Preston and the City (Collins Street) on 25 July 1937. Prior to this, it was first allocated to East Preston and St Kilda Beach via Holden Street and Swanston Street on 21 November 1929. Then, it was allocated to the Holden Street Shuttle following the electrification of the Brunswick Street cable line. However, since single-truck trams without number boxes were used on this line, the route number was never displayed. The electrification of the South Melbourne cable tram line on 25 July 1937 enabled through-running on Collins Street. Route 11 ran from West Preston to the city, but some services would continue as route 10 south to South Melbourne Beach (later St Kilda - Fitzroy Street).

Following the elimination of shared-depot routes, route 10 was discontinued on 30 April 1995. However, in April 2000, the West Preston to St Kilda - Fitzroy Street recommenced and was allocated route 112. Following this, Route 11 became a peak-only service, and was eventually phased out altogether by 28 June 2004. However, following the Victoria Harbour extension on 21 September 2009, route 11 was reinstated as a peak-only service between West Preston and Victoria Harbour. On 27 July 2014, route 11 became a full-time service following the cessation of route 112, and the establishment of route 12.

The origin of route 11 mainly consists of the North Fitzroy cable tram line and the West Preston line built by the Fitzroy, Northcote & Preston Tramways Trust (FNPTT). The North Fitzroy cable line was opened on 2 October 1886 by the Melbourne Tramway & Omnibus Company. The section between Spencer Street (Stop 1) and St Vincent's Plaza (Stop 12) was first electrified on 15 September 1929. The rest of the North Fitzroy cable line was electrified on 26 October 1930. Meanwhile, the FNPTT constructed the line between Holden Street (Stop 24) and Regent Street (Stop 47). Due to delays with available FNPTT rollingstock among other issues, the line couldn't open until the Melbourne & Metropolitan Tramways Board took over. The line eventually opened on 1 April 1920. On 3 July 1953, the West Preston terminus was extended to the north side of the intersection to clear the intersection.

Initially, the line to West Preston was single track north of the Miller Street/St Georges Road intersection (near Stop 34). It was duplicated in stages. On 28 June 1927, the line from Gilbert Road (near Stop 37) and Preston Workshops was duplicated. A few months later on 22 August 1927, this was further extended to Bell Street (Stop 40). It was further duplicated to Jacka Street (Stop 45) on 28 March 1928. The last remaining section of single track to the Regent Street terminus was duplicated on 19 November 1952.

On 18 November 2002, a tram line was constructed to Collins Street West along the Collins Street extension. However, from 28 June 2004 until 21 November 2005, the line was truncated back to Spencer Street while Southern Cross station was redeveloped. It was extended further along the Collins Street extension to Victoria Harbour on 21 September 2009. It was extended a further 450 metres west to the corner of Collins and Bourke Streets from 26 July 2014, which is today's Victoria Harbour terminus.

Operation
In 2015, E class trams operated out of Preston depot began to replace A class and B class trams that were operated out of East Preston depot.

Route map

References

External links

011
011
2009 establishments in Australia
Transport in the City of Darebin
Transport in the City of Yarra
Collins Street, Melbourne